América 24, recently referred to just as A24, is an Argentine news cable channel. Founded in 2005 by Pramer, it replaced a previous 24/7 news channel, CVN (Cablevision Noticias).

External links
 
The start of América 24 according to lanacion.com.ar 

24-hour television news channels in Argentina
Spanish-language television stations
Television channels and stations established in 2005